Pietilä is a Finnish surname. Notable people with the surname include:

Pekka Ala-Pietilä, Finnish businessman
Bonita Pietila, Finnish American casting director and producer for The Simpsons
Maria Pietilä Holmner, Swedish alpine skier
Reima and Raili Pietilä, Finnish architects
Tuulikki Pietilä, Finnish graphic artist and professor

Finnish-language surnames